Giuseppe “Peppino” Turco (7 March 1846 – 14 October 1903) was an Italian songwriter.

Turco was born in Naples. Initially he was a renowned journalist and poet, collaborating with the satirical newspaper Capitan Fracassa in Rome and various Neapolitan periodicals. However it is for his verses put to music that he is best known.

Funiculì, Funiculà
Turco lived in Rome for much of his life, but frequented the thermal baths at Castellammare di Stabia every summer. In 1880 it was there that he collaborated with Luigi Denza to write the verses for "Funiculì, Funiculà". The song became a huge international success and sold over one million copies, representing for many the birth of the modern Neapolitan song.  He died in his home town of Naples.

Other songs
Turco also wrote the verses to lesser known songs:
 ‘O telefono
 Uocchie nire
 Taranti, tarantella
 Capille nire
 Vocca ‘e rosa

References

External links
 Vesuvioinrete 
 Musica napoletana 

1846 births
1903 deaths
Musicians from Naples
Italian male writers
19th-century Italian musicians